Lee Yong-min (born 20 December 1974) is a South Korean sledge hockey player. He was part of the Korean team that won a bronze medal at the 2018 Winter Paralympics.

His legs were amputated following a car accident in 1994.

References

External links 
 

1974 births
Living people
South Korean sledge hockey players
Paralympic sledge hockey players of South Korea
Paralympic bronze medalists for South Korea
Ice sledge hockey players at the 2010 Winter Paralympics
Para ice hockey players at the 2018 Winter Paralympics
Medalists at the 2018 Winter Paralympics
Sportspeople from Gyeonggi Province
Paralympic medalists in sledge hockey